Jean Erasmus (born 17 May 1991) is a South African born Namibian tennis player.

Erasmus has a career high ATP singles ranking 1591, achieved on 30 July 2018, he also has a career high doubles ranking of 1124, achieved on 4 July 2011. Erasmus has played 1 ITF doubles final.
 
Erasmus has represented Namibia at Davis Cup, where he has a win–loss record of 21–22.

He played tennis at Drake University between from 2009 to 2013.

Future and Challenger finals

Doubles 1 (0–1)

Davis Cup

Participations: (21–22)

   indicates the outcome of the Davis Cup match followed by the score, date, place of event, the zonal classification and its phase, and the court surface.

References

External links
 
 
 
 Drake profile

1991 births
Living people
Namibian male tennis players
College men's tennis players in the United States
Drake Bulldogs athletes
Competitors at the 2019 African Games
African Games competitors for Namibia
Competitors at the 2011 Summer Universiade
Competitors at the 2013 Summer Universiade